Danijel Mađarić (born 13 November 1974) is a retired Croatian football goalkeeper.

Club career
Mađarić started his professional career with NK Varteks in 1996 and left the club for Polish side Zagłębie Lubin in 2003, eventually returning to Varteks in 2006. He left Varteks in the summer of 2009 and was briefly without a club, before joining NK Čakovec in the fourth tier of Croatian football on a short-term contract in September 2009. He went on to join NK Međimurje in January 2010, becoming the club's first-choice goalkeeper in the latter stages of the 2009–10 season, which saw them being relegated from the Croatian First League.

In February 2011, he was sentenced to seven months in prison for his involvement in match fixing during his spell with NK Međimurje the previous season. He subsequently received a lifetime ban by the Croatian Football Federation.

References

External links
Danijel Mađarić profile at Nogometni Magazin 

1977 births
Living people
Sportspeople from Čakovec
Association football goalkeepers
Croatian footballers
NK Varaždin players
Zagłębie Lubin players
NK Čakovec players
NK Međimurje players
Croatian Football League players
Ekstraklasa players
Expatriate footballers in Poland
Croatian expatriate sportspeople in Poland
Sportspeople involved in betting scandals
Match fixers
Sportspeople banned for life